Weather Systems is the ninth album by the British rock band Anathema. It was released on 16 April 2012 in Europe via Kscope and 24 April 2012 in the US via The End Records. The band describes the album as  "not background music for parties. The music is written to deeply move the listener". The album was recorded in Liverpool, North Wales and Oslo, each place significant to Anathema's past, present and future. The record was produced by band members Vincent Cavanagh and Daniel Cavanagh, as well as Christer-André Cederberg.

Recorded and released between the departure of Les Smith and the full-time joining of live member Daniel Cardoso, it is the first album of the band to not feature a full-time keyboardist since Judgement in 1999; instead, keyboard duties were shared between Vincent and Daniel Cavanagh, and drummer John Douglas. On future albums, Cardoso would replace Douglas as the band's primary keyboardist.

The album's official track list was announced on 2 February 2012.

Reception

Terrorizer noted that the album had "a lot to live up to" following We're Here Because We're Here. The review noted that the songs on Weather Systems are "not instantaneous" as the previous album, but "its highlight is the way it decides to gently ebb from a dreamlike state in songs like 'The Beginning and the End' into the huge crescendo of 'The Lost Child' and elating release of 'Internal Landscapes'", and concluded that "Is it another masterpiece? Of course it is."

Packaging
In the special edition, both discs come in a limited pressed hardcover digibook like their previous albums: Hindsight, We're Here Because We're Here, and Falling Deeper. Kscope store also has the standard jewel case edition with the album on CD format and no DVD. The American version of the album comes in a digisleeve.

The special edition DVD can only be found on the European pressing directly from Kscope. Also, the DVD features the album in 5.1 surround sound.

Track listing

Singles
'Untouchable Part 1 Digital Single
 "Untouchable Part 1" – 6:14

Untouchable Part 2 Digital Single
 "Untouchable Part 2" – 5:33
 "Untouchable Part 2" (Live) – 5:43
 "Untouchable Part 2" (Live Video) – 5:43

Personnel

 Daniel Cavanagh – lead vocals, electric guitar, acoustic guitar, bass guitar, keyboards, piano
 Jamie Cavanagh – bass guitars on "The Storm Before the Calm"
 Vincent Cavanagh – lead vocals, keyboards, programming, electric, acoustic and bass guitars on "The Storm Before the Calm", backing vocals on "Sunlight"
 John Douglas – drums, keyboards and programming on "The Storm Before the Calm"
 Lee Douglas – lead and backing vocals

Guest musicians
 Petter Carlsen – backing vocals on "Untouchable, Parts 1 and 2"
 Christer-André Cederberg – bass guitars, Piano on "The Beginning and the End"
 Joe Geraci – Spoken word on "Internal Landscapes"
 Wetle Holte – drums on "Untouchable, Part 1" and "The Gathering of the Clouds"

Production
 Christer-André Cederberg, Vincent Cavanagh, Daniel Cavanagh – production

Charts

References

External links
Weather Systems review on Prog-Sphere.com

2012 albums
Anathema (band) albums
Kscope albums